In February 2011 Time Out surveyed 150 film industry experts to produce its list of "The 100 best British films." Nicolas Roeg's Don't Look Now topped the list. An updated list was published in May 2021, retaining the same rankings but adding four films (The Souvenir, Scum, God's Own Country, and Dunkirk) in place of Listen to Britain, Penda's Fen, I'm All Right Jack, and School for Scoundrels.

List breakdown
The 1960s came out as the most popular decade, with 19 films (the 1940s and 1970s each had 17 films), and the most popular years were 1968, 1970, 1980, and 1999, with four films each. The earliest films chosen were from 1929 (Blackmail, Piccadilly, and A Cottage on Dartmoor). The most recent film was from 2009 (Fish Tank).
The most popular director was Michael Powell, with seven films, six of which were directed with Emeric Pressburger as the team of Powell and Pressburger ("The Archers"). Alfred Hitchcock, David Lean, Mike Leigh, and Nicolas Roeg had four films each.  Seven of the films were produced by Ealing Studios.

The list

See also
BFI Top 100 British films
Abraccine Top 100 Brazilian films
100 Italian films to be saved

External links
Time Out list
"What's the Best British Film of All Time?" TIME Magazine

References

Lists of British award winners
Lists of British films
Top film lists
2011 in British cinema